Brent Regner (born May 17, 1989) is a Canadian former professional ice hockey defenceman. He played in the National Hockey League (NHL) with the Florida Panthers. Regner was selected by the Columbus Blue Jackets in the 5th round (137th overall) of the 2008 NHL Entry Draft.

Playing career

Junior
After completing two years of midget hockey with the Fort Saskatchewan Rangers, Regner debuted at the junior level in the 2005–06 season. He played one game with the Vancouver Giants of the Western Hockey League (WHL) while also appearing in five games with the Fort Saskatchewan Traders of the Alberta Junior Hockey League. The following season, he recorded 6 points in 64 games as a rookie with the Giants. Regner added 6 points in 22 playoff games, helping the Giants to the President's Cup Finals, where they were defeated by the Medicine Hat Tigers in seven games. Despite the loss, the Giants went on to the 2007 Memorial Cup, qualifying as the pre-determined tournament host team. In the national tournament, Vancouver and Medicine Hat met again in the final, with the Giants winning 3–1.

Playing in his second full WHL season, Regner improved to 47 points in 72 games. The Giants failed to defend their Memorial Cup title, losing in the second round of the WHL playoffs to the Spokane Chiefs. Regner added 10 points in 10 playoff games. In the off-season, he was selected in the fifth round, 137th overall, by the Columbus Blue Jackets in the 2008 NHL Entry Draft.

Returning for a third and final junior season in 2008–09, Regner recorded 67 points in 70 games, setting a Giants team record for most points by a defenceman in one year. He surpassed teammate Jonathon Blum's mark of 63 points, set the previous season. Regner's record was short-lived, as Kevin Connauton recorded 72 points in 2009–10.

Professional
After being signed to an entry-level contract by the Blue Jackets in the off-season, Regner turned professional with the team's American Hockey League (AHL) affiliate, the Syracuse Crunch, in 2009–10. He recorded 19 points over 56 games in his AHL rookie year. Regner switched teams the following season as the Blue Jackets changed their AHL affiliate to the Springfield Falcons in the summer. Maintaining a similar scoring pace, he registered 20 points in 50 games with the Falcons.

A free agent following the completion of his entry-level contract with the Blue Jackets, Regner was signed to a one-year American League contract with the Peoria Rivermen on September 17, 2012.

After the two seasons spent primarily within the St. Louis Blues AHL affiliations, Regner was signed to a one-year, two-way NHL contract with the Blues on July 1, 2014.

On July 1, 2015, Regner left the Blues as a free agent to sign a two-year, two-way contract with the Florida Panthers.

On July 1, 2017, Regner signed as a free agent from the Panthers to a one-year, two-way contract with the Dallas Stars.

After spending his first 9 professional seasons primarily within the AHL, Regner opted to embark on a European career, agreeing to a one-year contract with Austrian outfit, EC Red Bull Salzburg of the EBEL, on July 19, 2018.

Career statistics

Awards and honors

References

External links

1989 births
Canadian ice hockey defencemen
Chicago Wolves players
Columbus Blue Jackets draft picks
Evansville IceMen players
Florida Panthers players
Fort Saskatchewan Traders players
Living people
Peoria Rivermen (AHL) players
Portland Pirates players
EC Red Bull Salzburg players
Springfield Falcons players
Springfield Thunderbirds players
Syracuse Crunch players
Texas Stars players
Vancouver Giants players
Canadian expatriate ice hockey players in Austria